Lord John Hay may refer to:

John Hay, 1st Lord Hay of Yester (1450–1508), Scottish nobleman
Lord John Hay (Scottish Army officer) (c. 1668–1706), Scottish general
Lord John Hay (politician) (1788–1851), British Royal Navy officer and Whig politician
Lord John Hay (Royal Navy officer, born 1827) (1827–1916), British Royal Navy officer and Liberal politician, nephew of the above

See also
John Hay (disambiguation)